QX Normae is an active low mass X ray binary in the constellation Norma. It is composed of a neutron star and a star smaller and cooler than the Sun.  The X-ray component, known as 4U 1608–52, was discovered in the early 1970s, while the visual component, QX Normae, was discovered in 1977. By analysing the interstellar extinction between Earth and the system, Güver and colleagues calculated the most likely distance to be 5.8 kpc (19,000 light-years), and the neutron star's mass to be  1.74 ± 0.14 times that of the Sun and radius to be a mere 9.3 ± 1.0 km.

References

Norma (constellation)
Normae, QX